Mendota is an unincorporated village and census-designated place in Washington County in the southwestern part of the U.S. state of Virginia, at an elevation of approximately 1411 feet. It was first listed as a CDP in the 2020 census with a population of 135.

There is a medical clinic there, a post office, two churches and several residences, but no market or gas station. The nearest major city is Bristol. Mendota is widely recognized as the 'Hawk Capital of the World, and it lives up to its name. 

The name Mendota is derived from a Native American word meaning "bend in the river". The village is located on the north folk of the Holston River. At least five different Native American tribes once fished this fork and hunted the surrounding grounds.

It is part of the Kingsport–Bristol (TN)–Bristol (VA) Metropolitan Statistical Area, which is a component of the Johnson City–Kingsport–Bristol, TN-VA Combined Statistical Area – commonly known as the "Tri-Cities" region.

Pre-History

In 1770, Peter Livingston and his family settled on 2,000 acres beside the North Fork of the Holston River at the mouth of Livingston Creek near present day Mendota, Virginia. The beautiful and fertile river bottoms of his farm yielded good crops and he soon had expanded his cleared land to several acres and eventually brought in slaves to help him work it.

All appeared well until the morning of April 6, 1794, when the feared, Cherokee Chief Benge and his followers quietly crept upon the unsuspecting cabins in an attempt to capture enslaved people to sell to the British. Working some distance away in the fields, Peter and his brother Henry only suspected trouble when they saw smoke rising from the direction of their homes. Rushing back to the scene, they soon learned that their wives and some of their slaves had been carried off. Not knowing the exact route the Indians might take, Peter and Henry followed the trail while others were sent to notify the militias in the surrounding area.

Lt. Vincent Hobbs and his Lee County Militia (of 13) were drilling at Yokum’s Station on April 9 when they receive the word. Hurrying toward Big Stone Gap, he overtook some of Benge’s advance party and quietly dispatched them. Then the Lee County Militia hastily set up an ambush in an obscure hollow near the gap. But before Hobbs and his men were ready, the lead element of Benge’s group came into view. Although the red-headed Benge fired from cover, the Cherokee chief was killed and the captives released. Hearing the gun fire, Peter and Henry Livingston rushed ahead and were soon reunited with their wives.

History

More recently, the town of Mendota was founded and became an important point on a railroad line connecting Bristol and Hiltons. In the 1920s, a town council worked to turn Mendota into a thriving community, but the government eventually faded due to lack of organization.  Eventually, the tribes and then the railroad moved on leaving Mendota struggling for a new identity. Today, Mendota is a quiet little village leading to recreational opportunities on the Clinch Mountain and Holston River.

Ecology

More than 16 species of raptors (hawks) soar down the spine of the Clinch Mountain every autumn, heading south for the winter along the Appalachian Flyway. The Mendota Fire Tower is a great location to view these hawks, especially at the peak of migration in mid September when up to 1,000 birds per day can be seen soaring past. Broad-winged Hawks are the most common raptors sighted, but the sharp-eyed birder will notice Sharp-shinned, Red-shouldered, and Coopers Hawks, Osprey, Bald and Golden Eagles, American Kestrels, Northern Harriers, Merlins, Peregrine Falcons, and Swallow-tailed Kites.

External links

References 

Unincorporated communities in Washington County, Virginia
Unincorporated communities in Virginia
Census-designated places in Washington County, Virginia
Census-designated places in Virginia